Aramil is a town in Sysertsky District of Sverdlovsk Oblast, Russia, located on the Iset River (Ob's basin),  southeast of Yekaterinburg, the administrative center of the oblast. Population:

History
It was established in 1675 as a sloboda near the source of the Aramil River. Town status was granted to it in 1966.

Administrative and municipal status
Within the framework of the administrative divisions, it is, together with two rural localities, incorporated within Sysertsky District as the Town of Aramil. As a municipal division, the Town of Aramil is incorporated as Aramilsky Urban Okrug.

References

Notes

Sources

External links
Official website of Aramil 
Directory of organizations in Aramil 

Cities and towns in Sverdlovsk Oblast
Yekaterinburgsky Uyezd